Sirius Entertainment was an American comic book company which operated from 1994 to  2007. Sirius Entertainment was founded by Robb Horan, Joseph Michael Linsner, and Larry Salamone, and was dedicated from the outset to publishing creator-owned properties.  Originally based in Stanhope, New Jersey, Sirius later moved to  Unadilla, New York.

Sirius published popular titles such as Linsner's Dawn, Drew Hayes' Poison Elves, Mark Crilley's Akiko, Jill Thompson's Scary Godmother, and Mark Smylie's epic fantasy Artesia. 

Linsner left the company around 2001. In the early 2000s, Sirius signed a bookstore distribution agreement with Diamond Comic Distributors.

Sirius appears to have gone defunct in  2007; by 2010, the company's line of back issues were being sold by Horan via his website CosmicTherapy.com. By 2021 the Sirius Entertainment website, sirius-entertainment.com, had changed hands.

Titles (selected) 

 Akiko by Mark Crilley (52 issues, Dec. 1995–Feb 2004)
 Animal Mystic by Dark One (4 issues, 1994–1995) — acquired from Cry For Dawn Productions
 Angry Christ Comix by Joseph Michael Linsner (one-shot, 1994)
 Artesia by Mark Smylie (two limited series, 1999–2001) — moved to Archaia Studios Press
 Banzai Girl by Jinky Coronado and Wilson Tortosa (5 issues, 2002–2003) — moved to Arcana Studio
 Chi-Chian by Voltaire (6 issues, 1997–1998)
 Dawn by Joseph Michael Linsner (various series and one-shots, 1995–2000) — acquired from Cry For Dawn Productions; moved to Image Comics
 Deady by Voltaire (2007)
 Demongate by Bao Lin Hum, Steve Blevins, and Colin Chan (10 issues, 1996–1997)
 Dogwitch by Daniel Schaffer (18 issues, Dec. 2002–Oct. 2005)
 Eleven or One: An Angry Christ Comic by Joseph Michael Linsner (one-shot, 1995)
 Empty Zone by Jason Shawn Alexander (8 issues, 1998–1999)
 Fang by Kevin J. Taylor (two limited series, 1995–1996)
 Halo, an Angel’s Story by Christopher Knowles (4 issues, 1996)
 Model by Day by Kevin J. Taylor (1994)
 Mosaic by Kyle Hotz (6 issues, 1999)
 Oh My Goth! by Voltaire (various short series and one-shots, 1998–2002)
 Poison Elves by Drew Hayes (80 issues plus various short series and one-shots, [June] 1995–Nov. 2007) — acquired from Drew Hayes' Mulehide Graphics; moved to Ape Entertainment
 Safety Belt Man by Robb Horan and Dark One (6 issues, 1994–1996)
 Scary Godmother by Jill Thompson (various short series and one-shots, 1997–2005)
 Super Information Hijinks: Reality Check! by Rosearik Rikki Simons (12 issues, 1996–Oct. 1998)
 Tower by Sean McKeever (2002)

References

External links

 
 CosmicTherapy.com
 Official site (cache)
 List of characters

 
Comic book publishing companies of the United States
Defunct comics and manga publishing companies
Publishing companies based in New York (state)
Publishing companies established in 1994
1994 establishments in New York (state)